Terrence Kenneth Cooks (born October 25, 1966) is a former American professional football player who was a linebacker in the National Football League (NFL) and the World League of American Football (WLAF). He played for the New England Patriots of the NFL, and the San Antonio Riders of the WLAF. Cooks played collegiately at Nicholls State University.

References

1966 births
Living people
American football linebackers
New England Patriots players
Nicholls Colonels football players
Players of American football from New Orleans
San Antonio Riders players